George Albert Tuck (1884–1981) was a notable New Zealand builder, soldier and diarist. He was born in Cambridge, Waikato, New Zealand in 1884.

References

1884 births
1981 deaths
New Zealand military personnel
New Zealand diarists
People from Cambridge, New Zealand